Empress Wang (王皇后, personal name unknown) (died January 21 CE), formally Empress Xiaomu (孝睦皇后, literally, the Filial and Congenial Empress) was an empress during the Xin Dynasty.

Lady Wang married her husband, the eventual Xin emperor Wang Mang while he was still a commoner (albeit a well-connected commoner, being a nephew of then-Han empress Empress Wang Zhengjun).  She was a daughter of Wang Xian (王咸), the Marquess of Yichun, who was a grandson of Han prime minister Wang Xin (王訢).  (Her marriage to Wang Mang is evidence that at that time, the Chinese prohibition against endogamy based on the same family name was not as strict as it was later.) 

Lady Wang bore her husband at least five children—sons Wang Yu (王宇), Wang Huo (王獲), Wang An (王安), and Wang Lin (王臨), and a daughter (personal name unknown) who later became empress to Emperor Ping of Han and was given the title of Princess Huanghuang during Xin Dynasty.

Wang Mang was publicly known for his marital faithfulness, and he put on the appearance that he had no concubines or other female liaisons in addition to his wife.  However, that was not true, for Wang Mang had affairs with at least three servant women and, later, a lady-in-waiting to Empress Wang.  He was also known for his minimising personal expenditure which extended to his wife.  In one incident when he was the commander of the armed forces under his cousin Emperor Cheng of Han, after his mother died, when Lady Wang came to greet the mourners she was in clothes that were so plain that she was mistaken for a servant.

During her husband's career, Lady Wang lost two sons at her husband's hands.  Wang Huo was forced to commit suicide in 5 BCE after killing a servant.  Wang Yu was also forced to commit suicide, in 3 CE, after the failure of a conspiracy with Emperor Ping's maternal uncles of the Wei clan to overthrow Wang Mang's dictatorial regency.  Because of these tragedies, Lady Wang lamented and cried so much that eventually she grew blind.

In 9 CE, after Wang Mang usurped the Han throne and declared himself the emperor of the Xin Dynasty, Lady Wang was created empress.  Of her two surviving sons, the younger Wang Lin was considered more capable, so Wang Mang created him crown prince, while Wang An was created the Lord of Xinjia.  Due to Empress Wang's blindness, Wang Mang asked Crown Prince Lin to move into the palace to attend to her.

Empress Wang died in January 21 CE.  After her death, her two surviving sons also died in the same year.  Wang Lin committed suicide by the sword after his plot to kill his father (because he was fearful that his father would discover that he carried on an affair with Empress Wang's lady-in-waiting Yuan Bi (原碧), whom Wang Mang had also an affair with) was discovered, and Wang An died of natural causes.  Her husband and her daughter would die in October 23 CE when Xin Dynasty was destroyed by the people rebelling as a result of the emperor's incompetence.

References 

 Book of Han, vol. 99, Parts 1, 2, 3.
 Zizhi Tongjian, vols. 32, 35, 36, 37, 38.

|-

Blind royalty and nobility 
Xin dynasty empresses
1st-century BC births
21 deaths
Year of birth unknown
1st-century BC Chinese women
1st-century BC Chinese people
1st-century Chinese women
1st-century Chinese people
Chinese blind people